Earl Lorden Field is a baseball venue located on the campus of the University of Massachusetts Amherst in Amherst, Massachusetts, United States.  The field is home to the UMass Minutemen baseball team of the NCAA Division I Atlantic 10 Conference.  The field is named after former UMass baseball coach Earl Lorden and was dedicated in his name on April 24, 1971.

Renovations
An electronic scoreboard was constructed beyond the left field fence before the 2001 season.

In fall 2012, a new outfield wind screen was installed, an artificial turf halo was added around home plate, and the facility's dugouts were renovated.

See also
 List of NCAA Division I baseball venues

References

External links
Photo Gallery of 2012 Renovations

College baseball venues in the United States
UMass Minutemen baseball
University of Massachusetts Amherst buildings
Baseball venues in Massachusetts
Sports venues completed in 1971
University and college buildings completed in 1971
1971 establishments in Massachusetts